Deer is an unincorporated community and census-designated place (CDP) in Newton County, Arkansas, United States. Deer has a post office with ZIP code 72628.

It was first listed as a CDP in the 2020 census with a population of 135.

Education 
Public education for elementary and secondary school students is provided by the Deer/Mount Judea School District, which includes:
 Deer Elementary School
 Deer High School
 Deer Community College of Agricultural Science

On July 1, 2004 the Deer School District consolidated with the Mount Judea School District to form the Deer/Mount Judea School District.

Demographics

2020 census

Note: the US Census treats Hispanic/Latino as an ethnic category. This table excludes Latinos from the racial categories and assigns them to a separate category. Hispanics/Latinos can be of any race.

Climate

References

External links
 Newton County Historical Society

Unincorporated communities in Newton County, Arkansas
Unincorporated communities in Arkansas
Census-designated places in Newton County, Arkansas
Census-designated places in Arkansas